Vegard Berg Johansen (born 15 July 1973) is a retired Norwegian football striker.

He started his football career in Svolvær. Joining Tromsdalen ahead of the 1993 season, he made his first-tier debut in 1997 for FK Haugesund. He was sold to C.F. Os Belenenses after the 1997 season, but after the 1997-98 Primeira Divisao he returned to Haugesund. In 1999 he joined his hometown football team, now called FK Lofoten. In 2000, he took yet another second spell in one of his former clubs, playing two seasons for Tromsdalen. After playing the 2002 season for Tromsø IL he was left out of the team for a year, before a third and final spell in Tromsdalen.

He is an younger brother of Stein Berg Johansen and Ørjan Berg Johansen.

Ahead of the 2006 season he became the head coach of Lyngen/Karnes IL. After the 2007 season he went on to IF Fløya, lasting through 2010. From early 2013 to early 2014 he was the chief executive officer of Tromsø Fotball.

References

1973 births
Living people
Norwegian footballers
People from Vågan
Tromsdalen UIL players
FK Haugesund players
C.F. Os Belenenses players
FK Lofoten players
Tromsø IL players
Eliteserien players
Norwegian First Division players
Association football forwards
Norwegian expatriate footballers
Expatriate footballers in Portugal
Norwegian expatriate sportspeople in Portugal
Primeira Liga players
Norwegian football managers
Sportspeople from Nordland